Christmas: The Gift Goes On is the first Christmas album by gospel singer Sandi Patti originally issued in 1983 by Impact Records, then re-issued in 1987 by Word Records with a new album cover. The album consists of some traditional Christmas tunes and hymns along with original Christmas songs. The album reached No. 9 on the Billboard Top Christian Albums chart. The album was nominated for Best Gospel Performance, Female at the 26th Annual Grammy Awards and was certified Gold by the RIAA in 1988.

Track listing

Charts

Radio singles

Certifications and sales

References

1983 Christmas albums
Sandi Patty albums
Christmas albums by American artists
Impact Records albums
Word Records albums